The 2014 season marked Glamorgan County Cricket Club's 127th year of existence and its 93rd as a first-class cricket county. In 2014, Glamorgan played in the Second Division of the County Championship, Group B of the 50-over Royal London One-Day Cup and the South Group of the NatWest t20 Blast. It was the first season in charge for head coach Toby Radford. The on-field captains were Mark Wallace for the County Championship and Royal London One-Day Cup, and Jim Allenby for the NatWest t20 Blast. Unlike other counties, Glamorgan competed in limited-overs cricket without a nickname for the second year in a row.

Squad
 No. denotes the player's squad number, as worn on the back of their shirt.
  denotes players with international caps.
  denotes a player who has been awarded a county cap.
 Ages given as of the first day of the County Championship season, 6 April 2014.

County Championship

Royal London One-Day Cup

NatWest t20 Blast

South Division

Quarter-final

Statistics

Batting

Bowling

References

2014
2014 in English cricket
2014 in Welsh sport
Welsh cricket in the 21st century
Seasons in Welsh cricket